The 2005 Scheldeprijs was the 92nd edition of the Scheldeprijs cycle race and was held on 13 April 2005. The race was won by Thorwald Veneberg.

General classification

References

2005
2005 in road cycling
2005 in Belgian sport